Counter Culture may refer to:
 Counterculture, a subculture whose values and norms of behavior differ substantially from those of mainstream society
 Counterculture of the 1960s, a specific instance of the above
 Counter Culture (album), a 2005 album by Roy Harper
 Counter Culture (EP), an EP by British India
 Counter Culture (TV pilot), an American comedy television pilot